Speech of Silence (Traditional Chinese: 甜言蜜語) is a TVB modern drama series broadcast in June 2008.

Synopsis
Taste the bittersweet, breathe the love...
Read my mind between silence and sound

Tong Tong (Kate Tsui) lost part of her hearing in an explosion at a young age while trying to save her foster father and siblings. Since then, she uses a hearing aid to assist her. She is well liked by others and has an extremely positive attitude towards life despite her minor disability. With the support of her mentor Ko Ming (Yu Yang), Tong becomes a voice over talent by utilizing her lip reading ability.

At the production studio, she meets another voice talent Leung Kai-Yin (Kenneth Ma) who also has keen interest in the industry. Tong soon falls for Leung but is too shy to confess her love to him. Meanwhile, a colleague Yuen Siu Na (Claire Yiu) falls for Yin as well. Yin however is more fond of Tong and they fall in love soon after and began a relationship.

Unfortunately on one occasion, Tong's sister Chai Ka-Yee (Elaine Yiu) had everyone believe she was about to commit suicide after failing in a relationship. While trying to console her, Tong falls and hits her head causing her to lose her hearing completely. After the trauma, Tong lost all her confidence and shunned everyone else including Yin. Yin tries his best to encourage Tong to gain back her confidence and happiness in her life.

Cast

Viewership ratings

Awards and nominations
41st TVB Anniversary Awards (2008)
 "Best Drama"
 "Best Actress in a Leading Role" (Kate Tsui - Tong Tong)
 "Best Actress in a Supporting Role" (Claire Yiu - Yuen Siu-Na)

References

External links 
TVB.com Speech of Silence - Official Website 
K for TVB.net Speech of Silence - Episodic Synopsis and Screen Captures 

TVB dramas
2008 Hong Kong television series debuts
2008 Hong Kong television series endings